Zefir may refer to:
 Zefir (food), a Soviet Union type of confectionery similar to marshmallows
 SZD-19 Zefir, a 1957 Polish single-seat glider aircraft
 the original title for Zephyr, a 2010 Turkish drama film
 a peppermint cultivar

See also 
 Zephir (disambiguation)
 Zephyr (disambiguation)